Thomas Bürgler (born March 3, 1960 in Illgau, Schwyz) is a retired Swiss alpine skier. He competed in two events at the 1984 Winter Olympics.

World Cup victories

References

1960 births
Living people
Swiss male alpine skiers
Olympic alpine skiers of Switzerland
Alpine skiers at the 1984 Winter Olympics
20th-century Swiss people